São João da Fronteira (Portuguese meaning "Saint John of the frontier") is a municipality in the western part of the state of Piauí in Brazil. The population is 6,064 (2020 est.) in an area of 764.86 km². The elevation is 458 m.

The municipality contains part of the  Serra da Ibiapaba Environmental Protection Area, created in 1996.

References

External links
http://www.citybrazil.com.br/pi/sjoaofronteira/

Municipalities in Piauí